The Pinball Arcade is a pinball video game developed by FarSight Studios. The game is a simulated collection of real pinball tables licensed by Gottlieb, Alvin G. and Company, and Stern Pinball, a company which also owns the rights of machines from Data East and Sega Pinball. Williams and Bally games are no longer available since June 30, 2018, as FarSight had lost the license to WMS properties, which has since passed to Zen Studios.

The game is available for download on a number of devices through their respective online stores, including Android (along with derivatives such as Kindle Fire and Ouya), iOS, Windows (through Steam), macOS (through the Mac App Store and Steam), PlayStation Vita, PlayStation 3, PlayStation 4 (through PlayStation Store), Xbox 360, Xbox One, Wii U in North America only, and Nintendo Switch.

Tables are available for free limited demo play on Android, iOS, and other platforms. Every month, along with the release of downloadable content (DLC), four select tables on mobile versions are free with no Pro Menu features. PC versions are limited to one free table.

A spinoff called Stern Pinball Arcade was released in June 2016 for Gear VR, PlayStation 4, PC, and other platforms. This is a direct collaboration with Stern Pinball, to expand on re-releasing the company's more recent releases.

Development
The Pinball Arcade is developed by FarSight Studios, who also developed Pinball Hall of Fame: The Gottlieb Collection and Pinball Hall of Fame: The Williams Collection that were published by Crave Entertainment. Four tables were available initially with the game's launch: Black Hole, Ripley's Believe It or Not!, Tales of the Arabian Nights, and Theatre of Magic.

FarSight Studios took part in the Steam Greenlight program to distribute The Pinball Arcade for Windows-based personal computers. The game was successfully Greenlit on April 18, 2013. From August until October 2013, the PC version of The Pinball Arcade was in beta-testing. The Windows version of Pinball Arcade was released on November 4, 2013, along with the first 19 table packs. A Macintosh version of the Steam release was released on December 16, 2013. Although tables have to be purchased for each platform separately FarSight buyers of the Steam version are able to play their tables on OS X and Windows.

The option to buy a season pass for an entire season, including unreleased tables in advance, was cancelled in February 2014 on the Mac App Store due to violation of Apple's policies that do not allow sales of unreleased software.

On April 1, 2014, FarSight released a patch that included stereoscopic 3D support for PlayStation 3.

Besides recreations of existing pinball machines, FarSight is also producing its own original-design tables. A Ghostbusters-themed table was released in late October 2014 as a stand-alone application for Android and iOS using the same layout as Haunted House.

DirectX 11 support for the PC version with improved graphics (e.g., dynamic lighting, ambient light settings, and adjustable bulb brightness) was released on July 2, 2015.

The development of a version for the Wii console was considered but scrapped due to technical limitations.

On December 9, 2016, FarSight Studios announced Arcooda Pinball Arcade in cooperation with Arcooda, an Australian manufacturer of arcade and gaming machines. The game is an enhanced version of The Pinball Arcade running in a cabinet.

Al's Garage Band Goes On a World Tour, released on January 27, 2017, was the first table by Alvin G. and Company, the fifth distinct manufacturer to appear in the game.

Bally and Williams tables are no longer available for purchase following their non-renewal by the rights holders. The tables may still be played by those who already own them, but they can no longer be purchased as of June 30, 2018.  Zen Studios currently holds the rights to develop digital versions of such licensed tables.

Platforms

PlayStation 4 
A PlayStation 4 version was unveiled at E3 2013 with the intention of being launch title. Being the one of the earliest games to release for the platform, it had a spot on early demo stations. The game was released on a retail disc containing all Season 1 content on December 10, 2013. The game was released on PlayStation Network the following week in North America and in Europe the next day. The retail version was released in Europe on February 21, 2014. In March 2015, a variant of the retail disc was released titled Pinball Arcade: Season 2, containing all Season 2 content and Tales of the Arabian Nights.

Xbox 360 
Pinball Arcade was released on Xbox 360 via the Xbox Live Marketplace on April 4, 2012, but was discontinued in July 2013 due to the bankruptcy of publisher Crave Entertainment, combined with Microsoft's then strict publishing guidelines on Xbox Live. The bankruptcy led FarSight Studios to only add the game's first 10 tables until the discontinuation. FarSight hoped for some legal resolution and hoped to add more content.

After releasing the game on PS4, Alliance Digital Media became the studios' next publisher. On April 11, 2014, they confirmed that all other released content up to that point was submitted to Microsoft for approval and release. In May 2015, the game returned to the marketplace adding Table Packs 4 to 35, and a user interface revision.

Xbox One 
Although FarSight Studios expressed interest in working on Xbox One, they did not commit to developing the game until 2014. It was formally announced at GDC 2014 along the "ID@Xbox" Program, following Microsoft's relaxation on publishing policies before the Xbox One's launch. The game, plus its first three seasons of content, was released on November 24, 2014.

Wii U 
Despite being released on April 21, 2016, the game was intended for release within the system's launch window. When it was unveiled to the public, the game used the Wii U GamePad to display the HUD on its screen. This version was fraught with delays, pushing the game back to dates which included December 2012 and September 2013. The game was finally released in early 2016 release, though it lacked any additional features such as the aforementioned HUD option.

Nintendo Switch 
The Nintendo Switch version was announced on December 23, 2017, to popular demand. While the game was released as intended on April 6, 2018, it was removed from the North American Nintendo eShop that same day due to issues regarding at least one license. It was reintroduced to the Nintendo eShop on May 11, 2018, lacking all Williams/Bally content and included only 36 tables in DLC packs.

This version of the game included various features that were implemented into Stern Pinball Arcade via updates; including leaderboards, touch screen controls, and a "TATE" (portrait) screen mode.

Planned or announced
FarSight Studios announced on December 23, 2013, that a spin-off called Pinball After Dark was in development, as a way to combat the adult themes of certain tables without altering the main game's age rating.

FarSight plans to add a Head-to-Head Mode and Oculus Rift support.

Linux
On December 24, 2013, FarSight announced that they have begun working on the Steam Linux version of The Pinball Arcade.

Tables
Tables were previously available in season packs and pro packs allowing players to buy all tables of a season at once. Since the loss of the Bally/Williams license, tables are available in manufacturer packs with other manufacturers, such as Gottlieb/Premier, being split into multiple packs. Although tables are not necessarily released to all platforms and/or regions simultaneously, there are currently 101 published tables. (including The Addams Family: Gold Edition and Williams/Bally games.)

Pro Menus
In late October 2012, FarSight began to release "Pro Menu" upgrades for previously released tables. The upgrade lets the player control the camera to look around the table, control the ball, learn tips from pro players, and view the coin door and use the operator's menu. For Scared Stiff, it also grants the ability to turn off family mode with an uncensored voice-over. Pro Menus are not available on all tables due to the lack of features that didn't exist on the actual tables.

Exclusive tables
The Addams Family Special Collector's Gold Edition (The Addams Family table with gold accents as well as software and game play enhancements) was available through "Gold Mode" exclusively to Kickstarter backers who donated over $100.

Abandoned 
Farsight confirmed they will no longer support PlayStation 3, citing it as a result of the PS3 hardware. It is also likely that the Wii U and Xbox 360 versions were discontinued due to both platforms' irrelevance and current successors (Xbox One and Nintendo Switch).

Bally/Williams 
On May 7, 2018, the company confirmed it had lost its longstanding licenses for tables reproduced from Bally and Williams. It was announced that they would no longer be offered for sale after June 30, but they were actually still available through at least July 6, 2018. Customers who purchased any of these tables prior to the deadline will still be able to play them, and FarSight will continue to support them.

Kickstarter
FarSight Studios launched a Kickstarter project in order to cover the cost to acquire the necessary licenses to publish Bally/Midway's Twilight Zone table. FarSight Studios pledged to also digitize Williams' Star Trek: The Next Generation table if the Twilight Zone project reached double its $55,000 goal ($110,000). Funding of the Twilight Zone was successful. A total of $77,499 was raised to fund licensing for Twilight Zone. FarSight Studios President Jay Obernolte signed the license agreement for Twilight Zone on June 8, 2012. Surplus funds, after deductions from unfulfilled pledges and processing fees, were applied to a new Kickstarter project for Star Trek: The Next Generation that was launched August 17, 2012. This project was also successfully funded.

On June 21, 2013, FarSight Studios issued a Kickstarter to digitize Terminator 2: Judgment Day. It successfully surpassed the $59,000 goal with $62,360 raised. A similar Kickstarter campaign was utilized to digitize The Addams Family for release in February 2015. The $97,640 goal was reached on October 7, 2014, with $17,636 in excess funds being designated towards acquiring their next big-license table.

On December 25, 2015, FarSight Studios announced on Facebook that the next Kickstarter would be for Bally's Doctor Who. The goal of $54,364 was reached on February 13, 2016, with $16,566 in excess.

FarSight's most recent Kickstarter project launched on May 2, 2016 with plans to digitize Stern's AC/DC pinball table for Stern Pinball Arcade; the announced funding goal was $108,435. Due to a new partnership as a response of the positive reception, this Kickstarter was canceled as the intended funding was no longer necessary. However, as of July 1, 2019, the license has expired and the table is no longer available for purchase.

Legal alterations 
For some legal and licensing reasons, certain tables had to be modified. Some examples include alterations to key table art assets, removal of certain code, and omissions of some music. This also went as far as radical redesigning. Some examples include the removal of Christopher Lloyd's likeness in The Addams Family, the omission of SEGA and Data East logos and references on 1990s Stern tables, and the conversion of World Cup Soccer to World Champion Soccer and the removal of all references to "World Cup '94."

Table key

Published

 Although this table uses solid state electronics, it features an EM-style score reel.

Reception
The Pinball Arcade was well received by critics. It averages 84.83% for Xbox 360, 81.67% for PS3, and 80.00% for PlayStation Vita at GameRankings and 82/100 for Xbox360, 79/100 for PlayStation Vita, and 82/100 for iOS at Metacritic. IGN gave 9/10 for the PC and PS4 version of The Pinball Arcade and concluded: "For pinball fanatics or just those curious about gaming’s relatively low-tech past, Pinball Arcade is an excellent starting point for re-experiencing the golden days of quarter-munchers."

The Pinball Arcade won best mobile game of 2012 in X-Play's Best of 2012 Awards and was also nominated for best remake/retro release in 2012. The PC World website listed The Pinball Arcade at number 100 on their top 100 best products of 2012.

A BBC News article described virtual pinball games such as The Pinball Arcade as a way to preserve pinball culture and bring it to new audiences.

In 2016, Den of Geek ranked The Pinball Arcade version of Star Trek: The Next Generation as one of the top four Star Trek games.

See also
Microsoft Pinball Arcade

References

External links
 

2012 video games
Android (operating system) games
Crowdfunded video games
FarSight Studios games
IOS games
Kickstarter-funded video games
MacOS games
Multiplayer and single-player video games
Nintendo Network games
Nintendo Switch games
Ouya games
Pinball video games
PlayStation 3 games
PlayStation 4 games
PlayStation Network games
PlayStation Vita games
Video games developed in the United States
Video games with stereoscopic 3D graphics
Wii U eShop games
Windows games
Xbox 360 Live Arcade games
Xbox One games